Euselasia thucydides is a species of metalmark butterfly, Riodinidae. It is found in Brazil. Subspecies thucydides is found in eastern Brazil, ranging from Santa Catarina to Bahia and the Zona do Mato in eastern Minas Gerais, while ssp. truncata ranges through the central Planalto in Goias south east to the Serra do Cipo and to north central São Paulo.

The length of the forewings is 14–18 mm. Males perch during the early morning on sunlit margins of gallery forests, resting under leaves about a meter above the ground with wings folded. They fly rapidly, chasing each other about until returning to their perching spots.

Subspecies
Euselasia thucydides thucydides (Brazil: Bahia, Minas Gerais)
Euselasia thucydides trunctata Callaghan, 2001 (Brazil: Distrito Federal)

References

Riodinidae
Butterflies described in 1793